Alexander Kenneth Hamilton (11 May 191522 December 2001) was an eminent Anglican clergyman during the second half of the 20th century.

Educated at Malvern and Trinity Hall, Cambridge (he proceeded Cambridge Master of Arts {MA Cantab} in 1941), he trained for the ministry at Westcott House, Cambridge. He was ordained a deacon by John Willis, assistant bishop, at Holy Apostles, Leicester, on 8 October 1939; and a priest
by Guy Smith, Bishop of Leicester, at St Margaret's, Leicester, on 22 September 1940. His first post was as a Curate in Birstall, Leicestershire, after which he was a Chaplain in the RNVR. When peace returned he was Vicar of St Francis, Ashton Gate. Appointed Rural Dean of Central Newcastle in 1962, when Vicar of the Parish Church of St John the Baptist, Grainger Street, he became Bishop of Jarrow, a suffragan bishop in the Diocese of Durham, three years later. He was ordained (consecrated) a bishop by Donald Coggan, Archbishop of York, on St Matthias' day (24 February) 1965.

References

1915 births
People educated at Malvern College
Alumni of Trinity Hall, Cambridge
Royal Naval Volunteer Reserve personnel of World War II
Bishops of Jarrow
20th-century Church of England bishops
2001 deaths
Royal Navy chaplains
World War II chaplains